Galiyakot is a town in Dungarpur District of Rajasthan, India. It is situated about 56 km from Dungarpur city and 168km from the Rajasthan city of Udaipur and is a Dawoodi Bohra pilgrimage site.  The town is famous for the tomb of Babjee Moula Syedi Fakhruddin who lived there in the 11th century.  Many Dawoodi Bohra Muslims visit the tomb each year to pay homage.

Geography
It has an average elevation of 145 metres (475 feet).

Demographics
 India census, Galiakot had a population of 6,636. Males constitute 51% of the population and females 49%. Galiakot has an average literacy rate of 56%, lower than the national average of 59.5%: male literacy is 67%, and female literacy is 44%. In Galiakot, 17% of the population is under 6 years of age. This place was also known or famous for Ramkada udhyog.

Photo gallery

Notes and references

Cities and towns in Dungarpur district
Dawoodi Bohras